Canberra Croatia Football Club is an Australian semi-professional soccer club based in the suburb of Deakin in the south of Canberra, Australian Capital Territory founded in 1958. The club currently competes in the National Premier Leagues Capital Football.

Since 1960, Canberra Croatia has always competed in the top level of ACT soccer either side of a brief stint in the top level of NSW soccer between 1988 and 1994. They are the most successful soccer club in ACT history with 23 league premierships and 18 finals championships and ACT Federation Cups collected.

History

Establishment and early years

Canberra FC was established in 1958 by the local Canberran Croatian community as Croatia Soccer Club but was simply known as Croatia. The club commenced competitive play and entered the ACT second division in 1959. After spending one season in the second division, Croatia SC was promoted to the first division.

In 1960 the newly formed ACT Soccer Association, working under the title of Soccer Canberra, introduced new club naming regulations that prohibited names with ethnic ties. Croatia SC changed its name to Soccer Club HOPE in accordance to the new regulations. The name however was chosen to reflect the acronym of the Croatian Liberation Movement, who are known as HOP.

SC HOPE won its first title in 1962, beating Kosciusko to the league Premiership crown. HOPE backed up this first title up with success in the finals series as the club added the Championship title to its honours list with a 7–3 victory over Kosciusko in the grand final. HOPE additionally added the 1962 ACT Federations Cup and NSW Robertson Cup to complete a quadruple title haul. The club added a further two premierships and a championship to its cabinet between 1963 and 1966 as HOPE and Juventus battled it out in the league and finals for titles.

In 1967 the club changed its name back to Croatia with a slightly different full name of Croatia Deakin Soccer Club to reflect the suburb the club is from and based. Croatia finished the 1967 season as league runner-up to Juventus but claimed a 2–1 victory in the grand final over Cooma United.

17 August 1969, Croatia Deakin claimed its fourth league title of its first full decade in ACT soccer and twelfth title overall (4 Premierships & Championships, 2 Federation Cups, 1 ACT Ampol Cup and 1 NSW Robertson Cup). Then on 11 November 1969, to complete the decade, Croatia Deakin opened its clubrooms, restaurants and bars on Grose St Deakin, across the road from the soccer ground. This new clubhouse and soccer facilities was the first of its kind in Canberra.

70s and 80s

The 1970s and 80s saw the club continue accomplishment on the field with more premiership and trophy successes. The highlight of these successes was the three consecutive undefeated seasons between 1986 and 1988 when Deakin registered a total 42 wins, 6 draws, 0 losses, 174 goals for and 27 goals against.

In 1975, Croatia Deakin competed in the inaugural full Croatian Australian Tournament (Croatian Cup). The tournament was established to provide Australian and New Zealand soccer clubs with Croatian heritage a cup competition to compete for following Melbourne Croatia's expulsion from the Victorian Soccer Federation in 1974. Sydney Croatia hosted the tournament with Croatia Deakin defeating the hosts 3–1 in the tournament final.

In 1989, Croatia Deakin changed its name to Canberra Croatia and replaced Canberra City Griffins in the NSW Division One (highest league in NSW). Canberra Croatia finished its first season in NSW as runner-up to Melita Eagles and lost the grand final 2–0 to the same opposition.

90s and 2000s 

Canberra Croatia competed in the top division of NSW until 1995 with the club qualifying for finals five out of six seasons. Croatia finished league runner-up in 1990 and lost the grand final in 1990 and 91 to Wollongong Macedonia and Blacktown City respectively. The club also changed its official name twice during this period to Canberra Metro (91–92) and Canberra Deakin in 1993.

In 1995 the club returned to ACT soccer and re-joined the ACT top division, by now renamed the ACT Premier League. Deakin marked its return to ACT soccer by winning the ACT Premier League with a fourteen-point advantage over second placed Shamrock Rovers and by defeating Juventus 3–2 in the grand final.

In 2006, Canberra Deakin changed its name to Canberra FC before the start of the 2006 ACT Premier League season.

24 June 2007 – 30 June 2007, Canberra FC participated in the inaugural ‘Croatian World Club Championship’ for Croatian diaspora in Zagreb, Croatia alongside other teams of Croatian heritage from around the world including Canada, USA, Germany, France and Austria. Canberra FC was a late entrant into the tournament after Sydney United had to pull out for financial and organisational reasons. The tournament was broken into two groups with the top teams playing off in the final and the second placed teams playing off for bronze. CFC topped Group B after a 5–1 victory over French club AS Croatia Villefranche, a 2–2 draw with SD Croatia Berlin and a 3–1 victory over HNK Zrinski Chicago. Canberra FC played Toronto Croatia in the tournament final and took a first half lead before a second half comeback by the Canadian club saw Canberra FC succumb to a final 1–3 defeat and claim silver in the tournament.

Canberra FC returned to compete in the Croatian World Club Championship in 2011 and 2015. Canberra FC finished with the silver, again, in 2011 with a 0–5 loss, again, to Toronto Croatia in the final. In 2015 Canberra FC finished fourth in the tournament with the side defeated 0–3 once more by Toronto Croatia in the bronze play-off.

NPL era

Canberra FC was a founding member of the NPL ACT in 2013 following Football Federation Australia’s national re-structure of soccer leagues in Australia. Canberra FC finished its first NPL season as league premiers, seven points ahead of second placed Belconnen United. Deakin won the major semi-final against the same opposition 4–0 before succumbing 0–2 in extra time to Canberra Olympic at McKellar Park in the grand final.

During the first four seasons of the NPL, Canberra FC won two league titles in 2013 and 2015 and lost four grand finals in a row between 2013 and 2016.

23 March 2017, it was reported that Canberra FC had joined the recently formed Australian Association of Football Clubs. This Association was set-up to represent National Premier League clubs interests at local, state and national levels.

In 2018, Canberra FC won the ACT treble by claiming the League premiership, finals championship and the Federation Cup titles. The head coach, Paul Macor, stood down from his position after just one season, being replaced by Luka Udjur as head coach for the 2019 season.

Club identity

Colours and badge
The club colours are red, white and blue reflecting the club's Croatian heritage.  The badge depicts the flagpole of Parliament House, a symbol of Canberra, over red and white check reflecting the Coat of arms of Croatia.

Club name changes 

The club was founded in 1958 as Croatia Soccer Club by local Croatian Australians, later being renamed HOPE, Croatia Deakin, Canberra Croatia, Canberra Metro, Canberra Deakin, Canberra FC before returning to the name Canberra Croatia after the abolition of the National Club Identity Policy allowing teams to return to ethnic names.

Home ground and facilities
Deakin Stadium (formerly Deakin Football Centre) is the home stadium of Canberra Croatia. It is owned by Croatia Deakin Football Club, who also own Canberra Croatia. The suburban ground went through a major reconstruction between 2005 and 2008 and was officially re-opened in 2008. The ground's official capacity is 1,500 but its record attendance is 2,782 (2016 NPL Grand Final between Canberra Croatia and Canberra Olympic).

Players

Current squad

Notable former players

Below is a list of players who have represented Canberra FC at senior or junior level and who have at least one senior or junior international cap for a FIFA sanctioned national team or at least one club cap for a top division national league.

Honours
 

ACT

ACT League Premiers and Finals Champions
Premiers (23): 1962, 1963, 1966, 1969, 1973, 1979, 1986, 1987, 1988, 1995, 2001, 2002, 2003, 2004, 2005, 2007, 2008, 2009, 2010, 2011,  2013, 2015, 2018
Champions (17): 1962, 1966, 1967, 1978, 1979, 1987, 1988, 1995, 2003, 2004, 2005, 2007, 2009, 2010, 2011, 2018, 2020

Capital Football Federation Cup
Winners (18): 1962, 1964, 1972, 1974, 1978, 1984, 1985, 1986, 1995, 2002, 2004, 2006, 2007, 2009, 2010, 2011, 2012, 2018

ACT Ampol Cup
Winners (5): 1963, 1972, 1973, 1987, 1988

ACT Club Championship
Winners (12): 1977, 1979, 1980, 1986, 1987, 1988, 1995, 2002, 2004, 2005, 2008, 2011

NSW

NSW Division One
 League Runner-up (2): 1989, 1990
 Grand Final Runner-up (3): 1989, 1990, 1991

Waratah Cup
Winners (1): 1990 
Runner-up (1): 1992

Robertson Cup
Champions (1): 1962

Other

Croatian Cup (Australia & New Zealand)
Champions (6): 1975, 1986, 1992, 1994, 2001, 2005

Argentina Cup
Champions (1): 1983/84

Croatian World Club Championship
Runner-up (2): 2007, 2011

Head-to-head records

NPL Teams

Includes NPL Matches, FED Cup Matches, Charity Shield, ACT Ampol Cup, and Capital Football Federation Cup finals matches from 1962-2022

Non NPL Teams

Includes NPL Matches, FED Cup Matches, Charity Shield, ACT Ampol Cup, and Capital Football Federation Cup finals matches from 1962-2012

Season-by-season results

The below table is updated with the statistics and final results for Canberra FC following the conclusion of each National Premier League Capital Football season.

See also

List of Croatian football clubs in Australia
Australian-Croatian Soccer Tournament
Croatian Australian

References

External links
 Official club website
 Capital Football home
 NPL Capital Football home

Croatian sports clubs in Australia
National Premier Leagues clubs
Soccer clubs in Canberra
Association football clubs established in 1958
1958 establishments in Australia